The Peninsula Women's Chorus is a women's choir based at Palo Alto, California.

History
In 1966, after a decade of involvement with local musical ensembles, Marjorie Rawlins of Palo Alto founded the American Association of University Women Midpeninsula Chorus, with 17 members. She soon recognized the limitations of working within the AAUW graduates' organization, and abandoned the affiliation; the choir was subsequently renamed the University Women’s Chorus. The principles established from the outset were that, although the choir was informal, its aims would be ambitious. In particular, members were expected to sing all pieces from memory, and the repertoire was to be ambitious, with many pieces sung in foreign languages.

When Mrs. Rawlins left in 1975, the members, by then increased to over 50, appointed 25-year-old Patricia (Patty) Hennings as their new director. Under her leadership the choir, soon rechristened the Peninsula Women's Chorus to emphasize its inclusive recruiting policy (though it maintained an association with Foothill College), continued to increase its standards, and in 1982 was selected by Stanford University for a project to record vocal scores written from memory in a Second World War prison camp on Sumatra by Margaret Dryburgh and Norah Chambers, as recorded in the TV documentary Song of Survival. This was such a success that the Chorus performed in Europe in 1984.

Patricia Hennings, after suffering for several years from cancer, died in December 2001;  for a short time her place was taken by Karen Robinson. Between 2003 and 2020 Argentinian-born Dr. Martín Benvenuto served as the Artistic Director until Dr. Anne K. Hege was appointed in 2021 after serving as an interim Artistic Director for 6 months.

Known for its adventuresome programming and recognized as one of the leading women’s choruses in the U.S. and beyond, the PWC is dedicated to commissioning new works, discovering rarely performed works, and keeping classical choral masterpieces for treble voices alive. 

In 2008, the PWC was among the founding choirs of the New Music for Treble Voices (NMFTV) festival, which brings together diverse local and national choruses in the study and performance of innovative contemporary works. The PWC has assumed production of the festival in 2013 and in March 2023 the festival celebrates its 10th anniversary.

Commissioned repertoire
The Peninsula Women's Chorus adopted a policy of commissioning new works to suit the Chorus, in addition to scouring the musical histories of cultures throughout the world. In both 1999 and 2003, the Chorus received ASCAP awards for adventurous programming- the first group to receive the award twice, and between 1987 and 2001, they performed three times for the national convention of the American Choral Directors' Association. The Chorus has released 9 CDs, two of which have won the American Prize in the Community Chorus Category.

Grants, honors, and awards
 In 2016, the PWC was selected to perform on the primary stage at the ACDA Regional Conference in Pasadena, CA.
 In 2015, the PWC won first place for the American Prize, Community Chorus Category, based on the submission of their eighth CD Mostly Made in America. 
 In 2015, the PWC was selected to participate in “San Juan Coral” International Choral Festival in Argentina. 
 In 2011, the PWC won second place in the American Prize for Choral Performance for its 2010 CD Nature Pictures. 
 In 2011, the PWC was selected to participate in the Seghizzi International Competition of Choral Singing in Gorizia, Italy. 
 In 2009, PWC was awarded a grant from the Aaron Copland Fund for Music, which recognizes performing organizations "whose artistic excellence encourages and improves public knowledge and appreciation of serious contemporary American music." 
 In 2006, the PWC was awarded third place in the Béla Bartók 22nd International Choir Competition and Folklore Festival, women's division. * Twice the PWC has received the prestigious ASCAP award for adventurous programming, most recently in June 2003, reflecting the excitement of performing challenging contemporary music from around the world.
 In 2003, the PWC was awarded American Society of Composers, Authors and Publishers (ASCAP) Award for Adventurous Programming in the category for choruses.

Premieres by Peninsula Women's Chorus
World premieres, unless indicated otherwise.
2022 
Would You Like to Have it All?, by Jennifer Wilsey
2021
Despertar, by Karen Siegel (consortium commission by the Peninsula Women’s Chorus, Consonare Choral Community, West Village Chorale, and the Yale Glee Club)
2019
Hands upon the Plow, by Jocelyn Hagen (Trailblazers Project)
Rise Up, by Jake Runestad (commissioned by the PWC through the ACDA Women’s Consortium)
When the Dust Settles, by Mari Esabel Valverde (jointly commissioned by the PWC and VOX Femina)
2018
Moon Goddess, by Jocelyn Hagen (commissioned by the Peninsula Women’s Chorus through the ACDA Women’s Consortium)
2017 
Child of Impossibles, by Julia Adolphe (Trailblazers Projecr)
Come home little sister, by Cecilia McDowall
displacement I-V, by Eric Tuan (I. From Psalm, II. Overheard in Silicon Valley, III. Wayfaring Stranger, IV. Frosty night, V. San Francisco) 
Harriet Tubman, by Walter Robinson, arranged by Kathleen McGuire
Patterns on the Snow, by Mari Esabel Valverde (commissioned by the PWC through the ACDA Women’s Consortium)
2016 
A Blessing of Cranes, by Abbie Betinis (commissioned by the 2014 Women’s Choir Commission Consortium of the ACDA)
Flare, by Dale Trumbore (commissioned by the PWC through the ACDA Women’s Consortium)
Yellow Twig of Willow, by Stephen Smith (commissioned by the PWC through the ACDA Women’s Consortium)
2015
Oración del remanso, by Jorge Fandermole arranged by Eduardo Ferraudi
2014
Green Music, by Kirke Mechem
Heart Spells 1-3, by Mark Winges (Spell to Be Said upon Waking, Spell to Be Said Before Sleep, Spell for Inviting-in the New Soul) 

2013
Songs of Night, by Kirstina Rasmussen (Night, Oportunidad, Ololiuhqui, Antigua Canción) 
2012
 Alma Submerged, by Frank Ferko
 Ripple, by Ted Hearne
 Song-Gatherings, by Eric Tuan (co-commissioned by the Peninsula Women’s Chorus with Piedmont East Bay Children’s Choir and Acalanes High School Bella Voce)
2011	
 Bright Mansions, arranged by K. Lee Scott (treble version commissioned by the PWC)
 Face and Heart, by Pablo Ortiz (co-premiered with Volti, Piedmont East Bay Children's Choir, Cantabile Youth Singers, and Crystal Children's Choir)
2010	
Little man in a hurry, by Eric Whitacre (co-premiered with Golden Gate Men’s Chorus)
The Jumblies, by Judith Shatin
Viento, by Leonardo Lebas
Three Buttons (known as "What's This?"), by Frank Ferko
2009	
Martes, by Joseph Gregorio
2008
Nature, by Tal Peleg (student composer)
The Nickel Moon, by Laura Wise (student composer)
The Big, Shy Moon, by Miriam Helmy (student composer)
Wind Songs, by Karen Linford
2007
Acrostic, by Marta Lambertini
Looking at the Sea, by Chen Yi
Otherwise, by Brian Holmes
Thou Famished Grave, by Stacy Garrop
2006
Briefly it enters, and briefly speaks, by Brian Holmes
2004
The Snow Lay on the Ground, by David Conte
2003
Fanfare of Praise, by Sandra Milliken
2002
Jabberwocky, by Ron Jeffers
I Shall Keep Singing, by Brian Holmes
Benediction, by Ron Jeffers
Mila Begi, by Javier Busto 
2000
Psalm 121, by Libby Larsen
Aphorisms, by Ron Jeffers
Dos Cantos, by Ron Jeffers
I Am Dice, by Ron Jeffers
Falling Rain, by Brian Holmes
Rabbit Skunk, by Brian Holmes
Wish Song, by Brian Holmes
This wonderful feeling, three compositions by Joan Szymko
Bright Love, by David Meckler
Take Up the Song, by Ron Jeffers (U.S. Premiere)
1999
When You Are Old, by Peter Tryggvi Bjerring
Oh Great Spirit, by Michael Cleveland
For Lou, by Rick Kvistad (written for Lou Harrison's 80th birthday)
Carols and Lullabies, Christmas in the Southwest, by Conrad Susa 
1997
Christmas Intrada, by David Conte
1996
Two Songs of Love, by Michael Cleveland 
Jesu dulcis memoria, by Michael Cleveland
1995
Requiem for the Earth, by Nancy Telfer
Indian Singing, by Ron Jeffers
1993	
Miss Rumphius, by Victoria Ebel-Sabo
1991	
In Praise of Music, by David Conte
1990
There is No Rose, by Brian Holmes
1989
Refuge, by Libby Larsen
Ballad of Befana, by Kirke Mechem
A Christmas Carol, by Kirke Mechem
1981
Shenandoah, arranged by James Erb

References

Choirs in the San Francisco Bay Area
Women's choirs
Musical groups established in 1966
1966 establishments in California